The Opel 4/8 PS, also known as the doctor's car (Doktorwagen in German), is an automobile from the German automaker Opel.

Vehicle 
The Opel 4/8 PS was built especially for the middle class. The two-seater was small and agile compared to other cars of this time and was used by many doctors for house calls whereby the vehicle quickly got the nickname "doctor's car". The low price of 3,950 Mark made it a very successful model.

The doctor's car was the first car from Opel, which bore the Opel lettering on the radiator. 

Opel campaigned for the Type 4/8 PS (hp) with statements, such as "Simple mechanism", "Incredibly easy to use", and most of all: "Without using a chauffeur".

Engine 
The Opel 4/8 PS is driven by a water-cooled four-cylinder engine with a displacement of 1029 cc. The performance is eight horsepower, reaching a top speed of 60 km/h.

External links

 meinklassiker.com: Uschi Kettenmann, Herr Doktor fährt selbst: 100 Jahre Opel Doktorwagen, 7 January 2009, retrieved 8 February 2009 (German)

References

4 8 PS
Cars of Germany
Cars introduced in 1909
1910s cars
Brass Era vehicles